Farringdon is a London Underground and connected main line National Rail station in Clerkenwell, central London. The station is in the London Borough of Islington, just outside the boundary of the City of London. Opened in 1863 as the terminus of the Metropolitan Railway, the world's first underground passenger railway, Farringdon is one of the oldest surviving underground railway stations in the world.

History

The station was opened on 10 January 1863 as the terminus of the original Metropolitan Railway, the world's first underground metro line. The station, initially named Farringdon Street, was originally a short distance from the present station building.

The station was relocated on 23 December 1865 when the Metropolitan Railway opened an extension to Moorgate. It was renamed Farringdon & High Holborn on 26 January 1922 when the new building by the architect Charles Walter Clark facing Cowcross Street was opened, and its present name was adopted on 21 April 1936. It was built in conjunction with a freight station to take livestock to a slaughterhouse to its south-east to supply Smithfield Market; remains of cattle ramps on a street outside the market, West Smithfield. Smithfield was redesignated as a wholesale 'deadmeat' market in the 19th century and the freight station was last used in the 1920s.

The lines from Farringdon towards King's Cross St. Pancras run alongside the Fleet ditch, culverted since 1734. The station building is unusually well-preserved early 20th-century London Underground architecture. It retains indications of the Metropolitan Railway's main-line style operation such as a sign for a parcel office on the outer wall and some original signage, with the 1922–1936 name on the facade.

Thameslink trains to Moorgate ceased at the same time.

Recent and current developments
There are two major rail development projects in progress that involve Farringdon: The Thameslink Programme is a major upgrade to the existing north-south Thameslink route, enabling longer and more frequent trains, completed in 2018; and the Four Lines Modernisation involves the wholesale resignalling of the London Underground's sub-surface lines bringing a major boost in capacity to Circle, Hammersmith & City and Metropolitan line services calling at Farringdon.

Once these projects have been completed by 2023, Farringdon will be one of the country's busiest stations with approximately 200 , an average of one departure every 20 seconds. A new building, housing a dedicated ticket hall, has been constructed to serve these extra passengers. The new building is to the immediate south of the original station, which itself has been upgraded as part of the programme.

An additional entrance has also been built at the north end of the original station, onto Turnmill Street.

Thameslink upgrade

Farringdon Station has been rebuilt to accommodate longer Thameslink trains and to make other improvements to the station. The existing station building has been refurbished with a new roof canopy covering the north end of all four platforms and a new entrance and concourse facing Turnmill Street. An additional ticket hall has been built on the south side of Cowcross Street providing access to the Thameslink platforms, which have been extended southwards underneath this building, allowing the station to handle 240 m (12-carriage) trains. Platforms have been widened to accommodate increased passenger numbers. This process required the bridge that formed Cowcross Street to be demolished and rebuilt. Cowcross Street is now pedestrianised. Lifts have been provided throughout.

The existing listed ticket hall and concourse have been remodelled, for use by London Underground and Thameslink passengers. Interchange within the station has been improved by removing the interchange bridge and installing new stairs and lifts with access to all four platforms, allowing passengers with impaired mobility to use the station.

It was necessary to build the Thameslink platform extensions to the south, since there is a sharp gradient to the immediate north of the station. This resulted in the two-station branch to Moorgate being permanently closed. The platform extensions cross the former Moorgate line and reach within a few metres of the entrance of the Snow Hill Tunnel. The alternative of realigning both the Thameslink and Circle/Hammersmith & City/Metropolitan lines was impractical as the latter crosses over the former on a bridge almost immediately to the north of the station.

Elizabeth line

The Farringdon Elizabeth line station was built as part of the Crossrail project. It lies between Farringdon and  Underground stations and has interchanges with both of them. Access at the Farringdon end is via the new Thameslink ticket hall. Work was anticipated to be completed in 2018, but the scheduled opening date was delayed.

From 24 May 2022 the new railway line linked Farringdon to  Abbey Wood via Canary Wharf  in the east and Paddington, in the west. The station is also a hub for cross-London travel, being the only station to be on both the north-south Thameslink service and the east-west Elizabeth line service.

Direct Elizabeth line services between Reading/Heathrow in the west and Shenfield (via Whitechapel and Stratford) in the east is planned to commence in late 2022.

Dual traction current supply

Thameslink trains switch between the 25 kV AC overhead supply used to the north of London and the 750 V DC third rail supply used to the south whilst standing at the platform. The trains that formerly ran to Moorgate used 25 kV AC throughout their journeys.  This project was installed by the Network SouthEast sector of British Rail in May 1988.

Until the start of the Thameslink Programme southbound trains that were unable to switch to DC were taken out of service at Farringdon and stabled at Moorgate to prevent them from blocking the core section of the Thameslink route. As this option is no longer possible the catenary has been extended to City Thameslink to enable these trains to continue to the southbound platform at City Thameslink using AC and then return northwards using the new crossover in Snow Hill Tunnel. The pantograph on southbound trains is normally lowered at Farringdon.

Underground trains serving Farringdon use the four-rail 630 V DC system.

Accidents and incidents
On 5 January 1867, 16 people were injured at Farringdon Street station in a rear-end collision caused by a signaller's error.
On 5 January 1892, a defective axlebox resulted in the derailment of part of a train shortly after it had departed Farringdon Street. Five passengers were injured.
On 26 November 1907, a train in the process of departing Farringdon Street was rear-ended by a second train entering the station.
On 1 May 1939, a total of 31 people were injured when a Circle line train was involved in a minor collision with a railway engine. Seventeen passengers reported they had suffered shock and injury while a further nine subsequently complained that they had incurred minor injuries. Five crew members were also injured.
On 22 May 1954, three people in a lorry were killed when it fell from a bridge on to the tracks near Farringdon. A goods train collided with the lorry shortly after departing Farringdon.

Services

London Underground

All three lines share the same pair of tracks from Baker Street Junction to Aldgate Junction making this section of track one of the most intensely used on the London Underground network.

Circle line
The typical service in trains per hour (tph) is:
6 tph Clockwise via Liverpool Street and Tower Hill
6 tph To Hammersmith via King's Cross St Pancras and Paddington

Hammersmith & City line
The typical service in trains per hour (tph) is:
6 tph Eastbound to Barking
6 tph Westbound to Hammersmith via Paddington

Metropolitan line
The Metropolitan line is the only line to operate express services, though currently (when?) this is only during peak times (Westbound 06:30–09:30 / Eastbound 16:00–19:00). Fast services run non-stop between Wembley Park, Harrow-on-the-Hill and Moor Park. Semi-fast services run non-stop between Wembley Park and Harrow-on-the-Hill.

The typical off-peak service in trains per hour (tph) is:
12 tph Eastbound to Aldgate
2 tph Westbound to Amersham (all stations)
2 tph Westbound to Chesham (all stations)
8 tph Westbound to Uxbridge (all stations)
Off-peak services to/from Watford terminate at Baker Street

The typical peak time service in trains per hour (tph) is:
14 tph Eastbound to Aldgate
2 tph Westbound to Amersham (fast in the evening peak only)
2 tph Westbound to Chesham (fast in the evening peak only)
4 tph Westbound to Watford (semi-fast in the evening peak only)
6 tph Westbound to Uxbridge (all stations)
Farringdon is in Transport for London's Travelcard Zone 1.

National Rail
All National Rail services at Farringdon are served by Thameslink trains between St Pancras International and City Thameslink using part of the City Widened Lines and Snow Hill Tunnel respectively. Services are operated using  EMUs.

The typical off-peak service in trains per hour is:
4 tph to  via 
2 tph to  via  and Gatwick Airport
2 tph to Three Bridges via Redhill
2 tph to  via 
2 tph to  via Stevenage

The station is also served by a half-hourly night service between Bedford and Three Bridges.

Prior to 2009, Thameslink services also ran to Moorgate via Barbican with trains diverging from the core route east of the platforms at Farringdon. This section of line was closed as part of the Thameslink Programme which involved the construction of a new ticket hall and the lengthening of platforms at Farringdon to enable platform extensions to accommodate longer 12 carriage trains which covered over the junction in the process.

Farringdon is in Transport for London's Travelcard Zone 1.

Elizabeth line
Elizabeth line services began calling at Farringdon on 24 May 2022 and all services are operated using  EMUs.

The typical off-peak service in trains per hour is:
8 tph to 
8 tph to 
8 tph to 
2 tph to 
2 tph to 

These services combine to give a service of 16 tph in each direction. During the peak hours, the service is increased to 20 tph in each direction.

On Sundays, the services between Shenfield and London Paddington are reduced to 4 tph, with another 4 tph terminating instead at Gidea Park.

Connections
London Buses routes 40, 63, 341 and night route N63 serve the station.

References

External links

Circle line (London Underground) stations
Hammersmith & City line stations
Metropolitan line stations
Railway stations in the London Borough of Islington
DfT Category E stations
Tube stations in the London Borough of Islington
Former Metropolitan Railway stations
Railway stations in Great Britain opened in 1863
Railway stations served by Govia Thameslink Railway
Railway stations served by the Elizabeth line
Railway station
19th-century architecture in the United Kingdom
Charles Walter Clark railway stations